Schiavonesca (in , "Slavic sword") was a type of longsword characterized by a S-shaped crossguard that originated in late 14th-century Serbia and was used by knights in the Kingdom of Hungary and Republic of Venice during the 15th and 16th centuries. 

The Ottoman expansion and conquests saw north- and westward migrations of Serbs , initially within the Serbian state (the Serbian Despotate) and then to the neighbouring Hungary and Venetian Dalmatia. In Hungary, the Serbian population was very active in defending the southern border against the Ottomans. The production of this type of sword became more typologically uniform in Hungary and Venice.

The oldest specimens are estimated to date to the last decades of the 14th century, a period when Serbia was in constant conflict. The oldest mention is from the will of blacksmith Dobrič Bunisalić dating to 1391, held at the Ragusan Archives: "...doe spade schiavonesche...". 

The name originated from the Balkan Slavs who used such swords in Venetian service. The term Sclavonia was the common Ragusan name for Serbia, for the most part of history its neighbouring state.

References

Sources

Extern Links
 After six centuries the first forging a sword schiavonesca in Serbia, SMBladesmith 

Medieval European swords
Early Modern European swords
Serbian knights
Hungarian knights
14th-century establishments in Serbia
Military history of Serbia in the Middle Ages
Military history of Hungary in the Middle Ages
Military history of the Republic of Venice
Serbian Despotate
Serbian inventions